In molecular biology mir-277 microRNA is a short RNA molecule. MicroRNAs function to regulate the expression levels of other genes by several mechanisms.

See also 
 MicroRNA

References

Further reading 

 </ref>
 </ref>	
 </ref>	
 </ref>		
  </ref>

External links 
 

MicroRNA
MicroRNA precursor families